The Ayr Centennials are a Canadian Junior ice hockey team based in Ayr, Ontario.  They play in the Greater Ontario Junior Hockey League of the Ontario Hockey Association.

History
The Ayr Centennials were founded in 1982 as members of the Southern Junior D Hockey League. Clarence Eby, whose son and grandson would become heavily involved with the team, was a founding member of the club in 1982. In 1985, Eby's son Don started volunteering with the club. Don's legacy with the team began when son Scott started playing for the team at the age of 15, but Don's wife Julie waited a few years before joining her husband, taking over for her father-in-law Clarence as treasurer. Working in many capacities with the team, the pair ran the Cens' operations through most of the 1990s, which included paying the team's bills.

In 1988, the Southern League merged with the Western Junior D Hockey League.  In 1991, the Junior D rank was vacated and the league was replaced with the OHA Junior Development League.  This league lasted up until 2006 when it was vacated and the Southern Ontario Junior Hockey League was created.

The Centennials had success in the Southern League but failed to win any league titles.

In the bloated Western League and Development League, the Centennials did exceptionally well but still failed to make a dent.  In fact, despite finishing in the top ten teams of the league ten times in nineteen years, the Centennials never made the superleague's final once.

Early 2000s struggles
In the early-2000s, the Centennials lost their touch for winning.  In the last year of the OHAJDL in 2005=06, they had their worst season ever, winning only 2 games in 36 tries and finishing dead last. In three seasons, from 2005 to 2007, they only won 17 games. The team was at that point where it was ready to fold.

Return to prominence
Since joining the SOJHL in 2006, the Centennials have improved every season.  In 2006-07 they finished 17th with 6 wins.  In 2008-09 they finished 15th with 11 wins.  In 2008-09 they really came together and had their best season in years, winning 18 games and finishing 7th. In 2009-10 the Centennials continued to improve with a 21-11-4 record, solidifying 3rd overall in the SOJHL.

In the summer of 2010, the Bauer conference dissolved, leaving Thamesford, Ayr, Tavistock, Port Stanley and Wellesley to disperse into the remaining McConnell and Yeck Conferences. The 2010-11 season saw the Centennials best season since 1983-84. Finishing 4th overall in the SOJHL, the Centennials were the McConnell Conference Champions and advanced to the OHA Cup versus Thamesford, eventually losing in 4 games.

In 2011-12 the Centennials finished 4th in the McConnell Conference and 7th overall in the SOJHL, and lost to the eventual OHA Cup Finalists, The Hagersville Hawks, in 5 games of the second round of playoffs.

Promotion to Junior C and Schmalz Cup
In the summer of 2012, the Centennials and the SOJHL were promoted to Junior C to compete for the Schmalz Cup.  On March 12, 2013, the Centennials won the first ever SOJHL Jr. C championship with a 4-game-sweep over the Lambeth Lancers.

In the Spring of 2013, the Centennials were moved over to the Niagara & District Junior C Hockey League in a major realignment.  They were realigned again weeks after and ended up in the Midwestern Junior C Hockey League. Just three seasons removed from their jump to Junior C, the team won their first Schmalz Cup in 2016 by sweeping the Empire B Junior C Hockey League champion Port Hope Panthers in four games on the shoulders of starting goalie, Mitch Figueiredo.

In June 2016, Don and Julie Eby were awarded the OHA's highest award for volunteering, the golden stick. The team's home at the North Dumfries Community Complex sits on what used to be 30 acres of their farmland. It was back in 2009 that a former city councillor approached them about giving up the back lot of their land to build the NDCC, forever tying them to the team that they have given 30 years of service. The couple has been the ambassadors for the Centennials in that time, holding several positions on the executive – Don was assistant general manager and general manager, while Julie was treasurer – and, during the 2016 playoffs, were operating the ticket sales and door. Their son Scott is currently the team's head coach.

For the 2016-17 season the eight Junior "C" hockey leagues in Southern Ontario amalgamated into one league, the Provincial Junior Hockey League. The Midwestern League were placed in the Central Conference and re-branded the Pat Doherty division.

Purchase of Kitchener Dutchmen and promotion to Junior B
In April 2020, it was announced that the Centennials had purchased the Kitchener Dutchmen with the intention of acquiring their place in the Greater Ontario Junior Hockey League, thus promoting the team to Junior B status.

Season-by-season record

{|class="wikitable"
|- align="center"  bgcolor="#dddddd"
|Season	||GP || W || L || T || OTL || GF ||	GA || P || Results || Playoffs
|- align="center"
|1982-83	||36    ||21   ||12   ||3   ||-    ||--    ||--     ||45   ||2nd SJDHL
|- align="center"
|1983-84	||36    ||22   ||10   ||4   ||-    ||--    ||--     ||48   ||1st SJDHL
|- align="center"
|1984-85	||35    ||10   ||22   ||3   ||-    ||--    ||--     ||23   ||6th SJDHL
|- align="center"
|1985-86	||32    ||17   ||11   ||4   ||-    ||--    ||--     ||28   ||3rd SJDHL
|- align="center"
|1986-87	||40    ||22   ||14   ||4   ||-    ||--    ||--     ||48   ||2nd SJDHL
|- align="center"
|1987-88	||30    ||15   ||9    ||6   ||-    ||--    ||--     ||36   ||2nd SJDHL
|- align="center"
|1988-89	||35    ||15   ||15   ||5   ||-    ||213   ||178    ||35   ||12th WJDHL
|- align="center"
|1989-90	||35    ||21   ||8    ||6   ||-    ||220   ||181    ||48   ||4th WJDHL
|- align="center"
|1990-91	||39    ||26   ||11   ||1   ||1    ||233   ||210    ||54   ||4th WJDHL
|- align="center"
|1991-92	||35    ||14   ||18   ||0   ||3    ||195   ||222    ||31   ||11th OHAJDL
|- align="center"
|1992-93	||40    ||23   ||12   ||5   ||0    ||245   ||162    ||51   ||4th OHAJDL
|- align="center"
|1993-94	||40    ||21   ||14   ||5   ||-    ||233   ||170    ||47   ||7th OHAJDL
|- align="center"
|1994-95	||39    ||19   ||18   ||1   ||1    ||217   ||209    ||40   ||10th OHAJDL
|- align="center"
|1995-96	||40    ||20   ||18   ||2   ||0    ||192   ||182    ||42   ||8th OHAJDL
|- align="center"
|1996-97	||40    ||18   ||19   ||2   ||1    ||164   ||183    ||39   ||12th OHAJDL
|- align="center"
|1997-98	||36    ||19   ||10   ||6   ||1    ||165   ||126    ||45   ||7th OHAJDL
|- align="center"
|1998-99	||38    ||22   ||12   ||4   ||0    ||222   ||141    ||48   ||6th OHAJDL
|- align="center"
|1999-00	||38    ||26   ||10   ||1   ||1    ||200   ||125    ||54   ||6th OHAJDL
|- align="center"
|2000-01	||40    ||25   ||13   ||2   ||0    ||--    ||--     ||52   ||7th OHAJDL
|- align="center"
|2001-02	||40    ||16   ||18   ||6   ||0    ||181   ||182    ||38   ||12th OHAJDL
|- align="center"
|2002-03	||40    ||22   ||14   ||2   ||2    ||175   ||151    ||48   ||5th OHAJDL
|- align="center"
|2003-04	||40    ||12   ||22   ||4   ||2    ||138   ||171    ||30   ||16th OHAJDL
|- align="center"
|2004-05	||39    ||9    ||25   ||1   ||4    ||140   ||195    ||23   ||15th OHAJDL
|- align="center"
|2005-06	||36    ||2    ||32   ||1   ||1    ||100   ||252    ||6    ||17th OHAJDL
|- align="center"
|2006-07	||42    ||6    ||31   ||0   ||5    ||113   ||241    ||17   ||17th SOJHL
|- align="center"
|2007-08	||42    ||11   ||26   ||-   ||5    ||127   ||215    ||27   ||15th SOJHL
|- align="center"
|2008-09	||40    ||18   ||17   ||-   ||5    ||151   ||161    ||41   ||7th SOJHL
|- align="center"
|2009-10	||36    ||21   ||11   ||-   ||4    ||181   ||143    ||46   ||6th SOJHL
|- align="center"
|2010-11	||35    ||22   ||11   ||-   ||2    ||168   ||134    ||46   ||4th SOJHL
|- align="center"
|2011-12	||35    ||20   ||10   ||-   ||5    ||191   ||123    ||45   ||7th SOJHL
|- align="center"
|2012-13	||38    ||29   ||7    ||-   ||2    ||220   ||119    ||60   ||1st SOJHL-Mc ||Won League, Lost CSC QF
|- align="center"
|2013-14	||40    ||31   ||6    ||-   ||3    ||182   ||99     ||65   ||2nd MWJCHL   ||Won Quarters - 4-0 - (Bulldogs)Won Semi's - 4-3 - (Firebirds)Lost Finals - 2-4 - (Mounties)
|- align="center"
|2014-15	||40    ||32   ||8    ||0   ||-    ||229   ||92     ||64   ||1st MWJCHL   ||Won Quarters - 4-0 - (Applejacks) Won Semi's - 4-0 - (Mounties)Won League Finals - 4-0 (Merchants)Won CSC Quarter-finals, 4-2 (Grimsby)Lost CSC Semi-finals, 1-4 (Essex)
|- align="center"
|2015-16	||40    ||33   ||6    ||1   ||-    ||229   ||92     ||64   ||1st of 9 MWJCHL   ||Won Quarters - 4-1 - (Bulldogs)Won Semifinals, 4-0 (Applejacks)Won League Finals 4-1 (Firebirds)Won CSC Quarter-finals, 4-1 (Grimsby)Won CSC Semifinals, 4-0 (Essex)Won CSC Finals, 4-0 (Port Hope)
|- align="center" bgcolor=beige
|2016-17	||40    ||37   ||3    ||0   ||-    ||302   ||98     ||74   ||1st of 9-PJHLDougherty Div  ||Won Div. Quarters - 4-0 - (Bulldogs)Won Div. Semifinals -4-0 (Merchants)Won Div. Finals, 4-0 (Mounties)Won Conf. Finals, 4-0 (Grimsby)Won Schmalz Cup Semifinals, 4-3 Essex Won Schmalz Cup Finals, 4-2 (Port Hope)
|- align="center" bgcolor=beige
|2017-18	||40    ||31   ||5    ||1   ||3    ||218   ||98     ||66   ||1st of 9-PJHLDougherty Div  ||Won Div. Quarters, 4-0,(Bulldogs)Won Div. Semifinal, 4-3 (Mounties)Lost Div. Final, 3-4 (Braves)
|- align="center" bgcolor=beige
|2018-19	||40    ||19   ||19    ||2   ||0    ||158   ||140  ||40  ||6th of 9-PJHLDougherty Div  ||Lost Div. Quarters, 0-4,(Applejacks)
|- align="center" bgcolor=beige
|2019-20	||40    ||25   ||13    ||1   ||1    ||240   ||129  ||52  ||3rd of 9-PJHLDougherty Div  ||Won Div. Quarters, 4-1,(Merchants)Lost Div. Semis, 2-4 (Applejacks)
|- align="center" bgcolor=red
|colspan=11|move to JR "B" - GREATER ONTARIO JUNIOR HOCKEY LEAGUE|- align="center" bgcolor="cabbage"
|2020-21        ||colspan="10"    |  Season Lost due to COVID-19 pandemic
|- align="center" bgcolor=cabbage
|2021-22	||48    ||22   ||19    ||3   ||4    ||151   ||151  ||51  ||5th of 8-MWC14th of 25 GOJHL||Lost Quarters 0-4 Warriors
|}

Clarence Schmalz Cup appearances
Junior "C" Southern Ontario Championships
2016: Ayr Centennials defeated Port Hope Panthers 4-games-to-none
2017: Ayr Centennials' defeated Port Hope Panthers 4-games-to-2''

References

External links
Centennials Webpage
GOJHL Webpage

Southern Ontario Junior Hockey League teams
1982 establishments in Ontario
Ice hockey clubs established in 1982